Michele Smith (born February 12, 1955) is an American politician, who served as a member of the Chicago City Council from 2011 to 2022. She represented the 43rd ward on Chicago's North Side, including much of Lincoln Park and a small portion of the Near North Side.

Background
Smith earned a bachelor's degree in political science from SUNY Buffalo in 1976, and a J.D. from the University of Chicago Law School in 1979. After graduating law school, she clerked for Judge William J. Bauer of the United States Court of Appeals for the Seventh Circuit for two years, and then joined the U.S. Attorney’s Office in Chicago. During her time, she prosecuted over 400 narcotics, white-collar, and political corruption cases. Beginning in 1989, Smith worked for the Navistar International Corporation, rising to General Counsel for the Engine Group.

Political career

43rd Ward Democratic Committeeman 
In 2008, Smith was elected to serve as Democratic Committeeman of Chicago’s 43rd Ward and was re-elected in 2012.

Chicago City Council (2011−22) 
In 2011, Smith ran for 43rd Ward Alderman and assumed office on May 16, 2011. She was re-elected in 2015 and 2019.

Smith has taken an active role in ensuring that new development is community-driven. She renegotiated the Lincoln Park Hospital Redevelopment to decrease the intensity of use on-site. Since assuming office, her office concluded 5,307 constituent service requests, an increase of 50.59%. The number of street lights repaired and street potholes filled doubled, and the number of sewer cleanings tripled.

In addition to co-sponsoring the elimination of the Head Tax, she fought and saved condominium refuse rebate for several more years and obtained funding for past years’ deficits. Smith urged the City Council to reform the investment strategies of the city’s largest employee pension fund. The City council unanimously approved a resolution that urged the Municipal Employees Annuity and Benefit Fund of Chicago to divest from companies associated with Iran’s energy sector. During the 2012 city remap, Smith successfully advocated against splitting Lincoln Park among five different wards.

Smith resigned in August 2022, citing "deepening responsibilities toward family and friends." On September 19, 2022, Mayor Lori Lightfoot announced she would appoint Timmy Knudsen, chair of the city’s Zoning Board of Appeals, to replace Smith, pending confirmation by the City Council.

Committee assignments
Smith sits on eight City Council Committees:
 Ethics and Government Oversight (Chair)
 Budget and Government Operations
 Committees and Rules
 Environmental Protection and Energy
 Finance
 Human Relations and Health
 License and Consumer Protection
 Public Safety

References

External links
Michele Smith's political website
43rd Ward website

1955 births
21st-century American politicians
21st-century American women politicians
Chicago City Council members
Illinois Democrats
Living people
Women city councillors in Illinois